James Harris Alderton (6 December 1924 – 1998) was an English professional footballer who played in the Football League for Wolverhampton Wanderers and Coventry City.

Career
Alderton joined Wolverhampton Wanderers' youth ranks from school in December 1941. He turned out for the club 111 times during wartime, as well as guesting for Chester City.

After the Football League was resumed following the end of World War II, he made his official league debut on 16 September 1946 in a 0–3 defeat at Aston Villa. He made all his Wolves appearances during the 1946−47 season that saw the club miss out on the league title after losing on the final day.

Unable to hold down a regular place, he moved to Coventry City in 1947 where he played for five seasons until injury struck. He dropped into the non-league with Darlaston before later retiring from the game.

References
 

1924 births
1998 deaths
People from Wingate, County Durham
Footballers from County Durham
English footballers
Wolverhampton Wanderers F.C. players
Coventry City F.C. players
English Football League players
Association football midfielders